Hermann Brückl (born 3 November 1968) is an Austrian politician who has been a Member of the National Council for the Freedom Party of Austria (FPÖ) since 2015. He is a former Member of the Federal Council.

References

1968 births
Living people
Members of the Federal Council (Austria)
Members of the National Council (Austria)
Freedom Party of Austria politicians
21st-century Austrian politicians